Joseph Mazzello (born September 21, 1983) is an American actor. He is best known for his roles as Tim Murphy in Jurassic Park, Eugene Sledge in the HBO miniseries The Pacific, Dustin Moskovitz in The Social Network, and Queen bass player John Deacon in the biopic Bohemian Rhapsody.

Early life
Mazzello was born in Rhinebeck, New York, and raised in Hyde Park, New York, the son of Virginia (née Strong) and Joseph Francis Mazzello Jr., who owned a dance studio. Mazzello went to the Catholic school Our Lady of Lourdes. He is an alumnus of the University of Southern California, entering the USC School of Cinematic Arts in 2001 following a recommendation letter from director Steven Spielberg. Mazzello paid for school with his salary from a small appearance in The Lost World: Jurassic Park (1997), something the actor jokingly referred to as his graduation present from Spielberg.

Career

Early career: 1990–1998 
Mazzello's first film appearance was a small role in the 1990s Presumed Innocent, starring Harrison Ford. He then went on to appear in Radio Flyer, Jersey Girl and the TV film Desperate Choices: To Save My Child in 1992. In 1993, Mazzello got his first big breakthrough when he portrayed Tim Murphy in Steven Spielbergs Jurassic Park. Later in the same year, he also starred in Richard Attenboroughs Shadowlands. He later appeared in 1994s  as Roarke Hartman.

Both films were critical and commercial failures. Mazzello continued his film career with lead roles in Star Kid in 1997, and in Simon Birch with Ian Michael Smith in 1998. Both were critical and commercial flops. He also provided voice-over work in the English dub of The Adventures of Buratino.

Television debut and directorial debut: 2001–2009 
Mazzello's first film role in the 2000s was in 2001s Wooly Boys. In 2002, Mazzello made his television debut on Providence. He then appeared on CBS hit shows CSI: Crime Scene Investigation and Without a Trace. Afterwards, he appeared in Raising Helen (2004),  (2004),  (2006), and the short film Beyond All Boundaries (2009). Mazzello made his directorial debut with the short film Matters of Life and Death (2007).

2010–present 

In 2010, Mazzello played Dustin Moskovitz, one of the co-founders of Facebook, in the David Fincher-directed film The Social Network. His performance was well-received by critics and he and the cast were nominated for several awards. During this, he played Eugene Sledge on the mini-series . Mazzello went on to appear in G.I. Joe: Retaliation as G.I. Joe operative Mouse in 2013. In 2018, Mazzello portrayed John Deacon in the Queen biopic Bohemian Rhapsody, reuniting with his co-star from The Pacific, Rami Malek.  The Social Network earned $224.9 million, G.I. Joe: Retaliation $375.7 million, and Bohemian Rhapsody $903.7 million at the worldwide box office.

Filmography

Film

Television

Awards and nominations

References

External links

Matters of Life and Death official website

1983 births
20th-century American male actors
21st-century American male actors
American people of English descent
American people of German-Jewish descent
American people of Irish descent
American people of Italian descent
American male child actors
American male film actors
American male television actors
Living people
Male actors from New York (state)
People from Rhinebeck, New York
USC School of Cinematic Arts alumni
People from Hyde Park, New York